Lance H.K. Secretan (born in Amersham, United Kingdom) is a British-Canadian author of business books, best known for his work in leadership theory and how to inspire teams. A former child actor, from 1967 to 1980, Secretan was the managing director of Manpower Limited, the British subsidiary of Manpower Inc. Between 1980 and 1985, he taught leadership at McMaster and then York University in Canada and since 1985, he has worked as an author, independent management consultant, and coach and keynote speaker.

Education
Secretan holds a M.A. (magna cum laude) from the University of Southern California, which he received in 1977, and he earned a PhD in International Relations from the London School of Economics in 1980.

Publications

Books
The Bellwether Effect: Stop Following. Start Inspiring, The Secretan Center Inc, (2018) 
Peak Performers, The Secretan Center Inc, (2018) 
A Love Story: An Intensely Personal Memoir, The Secretan Center Inc, (2015)  
The Spark, The Flame and The Torch, The Secretan Center Inc, (2010)  
ONE: The Art and Practice of Conscious Leadership, The Secretan Center Inc, (2006) 
Inspire! What Great Leaders Do, John Wiley, (2004) 
Spirit@Work: Bringing Spirit and Values to Work, The Secretan Center Inc., (2002), 
Inspirational Leadership: Destiny, Cause and Calling, The Secretan Center Inc., (1999), 
Reclaiming Higher Ground: Creating Organizations that Inspire the Soul, The Secretan Center Inc., (1996), 
Living the Moment: A Sacred Journey, The Secretan Center Inc., (1993), 
The Way of the Tiger: Gentle Wisdom for Turbulent Times, The Secretan Center Inc., (1989), 
The Masterclass: Modern Fables for Working and Living, Stoddart, (1988), 
Managerial Moxie: The 8 Proven Steps to Empowering Employees and Supercharging Your Company, Prima, (1993), 
How to be an Effective Secretary, Pan Books,

Audio discs
A Love Story: An Intensely Personal Memoir 
ONE: The Art and Practice of Conscious Leadership – An Intensive 7-Day Audio Retreat 
Inspire What Great Leaders Do 
Reclaiming Higher Ground 
Inspirational Leadership 
The Keys to the Castle 
The New Story of Leadership 
Values Centered Leadership 
Living the Moment CD 
The Calling Meditation

Other publications
Love and Truth (The Business Case), Worthwhile Magazine, Sept–Oct, 2005
Williamson, Marianne, Imagine: What America Could be in the 21st Century, Rodale, (Lance Secretan contr.) 2000,

References

External links

1939 births
English motivational speakers
English motivational writers
English self-help writers
English spiritual writers
Living people
University of Southern California alumni
Alumni of the London School of Economics
People from Amersham